Maniema Fantastique or simply Maniema FC is a football (soccer) club from Burundi based in Bujumbura. Their home venue is 22,000 capacity Prince Louis Rwagasore Stadium.

The team currently plays in the Burundi Premier League the top level of Burundian football.

Honours
Burundi Premier League:1965, 1966, 1967, 1968, 1982, 1995, 1997

References

Football clubs in Burundi
Bujumbura